"Dusty Men" is a duet by Belgian singer-songwriter Saule and English singer-songwriter Charlie Winston. The song was released as a third single from Saule's third studio album Géant on 4 November 2012. "Dusty Men" reached top 20 positions in Belgium Wallonia, France and Italy. It was certified gold by the Federation of the Italian Music Industry.

Chart performance

Weekly charts

Year-end charts

References

Charlie Winston songs
2012 singles
2012 songs